En helt ny jul is a Christmas album by Amy Diamond, and her first album in Swedish. It was released in 2008 on the Bonnier Amigo Music Group label. It consists of both older and newer Christmas songs.

Track listing

Contributors
Amy Diamond - vocals
Per Lindvall - drums
Sven Lindvall - bass
Mats Schubert (BKO) - keyboard
Ola Gustafsson - guitar

Charts

Weekly charts

Year-end charts

References 

2008 Christmas albums
Amy Deasismont albums
Christmas albums by Swedish artists
Pop Christmas albums